Hot Wire is the fifth studio album by the glam metal band Kix. It was released on July 9, 1991 on East West Records.

Overview
Hot Wire peaked at number 64 on the Billboard 200 in October 1991. It failed to match the sales of Kix's previous album, Blow My Fuse, selling slightly over 200,000 copies. Producer Taylor Rhodes co-wrote five of the albums' ten songs with Donnie Purnell (the only Kix member credited as a songwriter). At the same time, Crack the Sky member John Palumbo and songwriter Bob Halligan Jr. (Judas Priest, Kiss, Icon, Blue Öyster Cult) got two co-writing credits each.

Track listing
 "Hot Wire" (Donnie Purnell, Taylor Rhodes) – 5:22
 "Girl Money" (Purnell, Rhodes) – 3:58
 "Luv-a-Holic" (Purnell) – 4:39
 "Tear Down the Walls" (Purnell, Rhodes) – 4:35
 "Bump the La La" (Purnell, Rhodes) – 3:28
 "Rock & Roll Overdose" (Purnell, Rhodes) – 4:29
 "Cold Chills" (Purnell, Bob Halligan Jr.) – 5:19
 "Same Jane" (Purnell, Halligan Jr.) – 4:33
 "Pants on Fire (Liar, Liar)" (Purnell, John Palumbo) – 4:12
 "Hee Bee Jee Bee Crush" (Purnell, Palumbo) – 5:33

Personnel
Kix
Steve Whiteman – lead vocals, harmonica, saxophone, acoustic guitar on "Tear Down the Walls"
Ronnie "10/10" Younkins – rhythm guitar
Brian "Damage" Forsythe – lead guitar
Donnie Purnell – bass guitar, keyboards, backing vocals, mixing on tracks 1-4, 6-9
Jimmy "Chocolate" Chalfant – drums, percussion, backing vocals

Production
Taylor Rhodes – producer on tracks 3, 5, 6, 8, co-producer on tracks 1, 2, 4, mixing on tracks 1-4, 6-9
Eddie DeLena – engineer, mixing on tracks 5, 10
Lawrence Ethan, Neal Avron – additional engineering
George Marino – mastering at Sterling Sound, New York
Hugh Syme – art direction, design
John Scarpati, Mike Hashimoto – photography

External links
Kix Official Website
Guitar.com 2014 interview with Kix guitarist Brian Forsythe

References 

1991 albums
Kix (band) albums
East West Records albums
Albums recorded at Sunset Sound Recorders